Vogrie Country Park in Scotland is managed by Midlothian Council. It consists of a woodland estate surrounding the Victorian Vogrie House.

Facilities in the parkland include a miniature railway, 9-hole golf course, children's play area and four miles of walks.

The River Tyne flows through the park.

External links
Vogrie Country Park - Midlothian Council

Country parks in Scotland
Parks in Midlothian